Chicago developed a hardcore punk scene in the early 1980s.  Chicago Hardcore is now characterized by fast, hardcore punk rock with familiar sounds to Boston, New York, and Los Angeles hardcore. Chicago Hardcore was, and still is, characterized by fast punk beats, angry protest lyrics, and melodic singing. In addition, the Chicago hardcore sound is considered one of the pioneering sounds in the creation of post-hardcore music.

Naked Raygun, Big Black, and the Effigies were popular at the emerging of the hardcore scene. These acts have also been seen as important to the development of the post-hardcore genre, as well as for fusing the hardcore sound with influences from the late 1970s and early 1980s British post-punk scene  

In the late-1990s, Chicago hardcore groups such as Arma Angelus, Racetraitor, The Killing Tree and Extinction began merging the genre with elements of heavy metal and touring nationally, while groups such as Baxter continued the city's earlier post-hardcore sound. Rise Against was founded, under the name Transistor Revolt, by former members of Arma Angelus, Yellow Road Priest, Baxter, and 88 Fingers Louie, pursuing a more melodic take on hardcore. Fall Out Boy was formed in 2001 by members of Chicago hardcore groups such as Arma Angelus, Racetraitor, Extinction, and Yellow Road Priest wishing to pursue a more pop-centric and radio friendly sound. Around this same time, former Racetraitor and Killtheslavemaster and future-Fall Out Boy drummer Andy Hurley, along with members of 7 Angels 7 Plagues and Vegan Reich, formed Project Rocket, a similar departure into more accessible music.

In recent years, the scene has had a wave of heavy, down-tuned hardcore bands come into the national and international spotlight. Harm's Way, No Zodiac, and Weekend Nachos hail from Chicago. Harm's Way is signed to Deathwish Inc., and has toured with Backtrack, Expire, and Suburban Scum. Weekend Nachos, with their powerviolence sound, has been signed to Relapse Records.

See also
 Chicago Record Labels
 List of Chicago hardcore punk bands
 Music of Chicago
 Music of Illinois
 You Weren't There: A History of Chicago Punk 1977-1984 (dir. Joe Losurdo and Christina Tillman) (2007) - Documentary

References

External links

Hardcore punk
Music of Chicago